The Uinta chipmunk or hidden forest chipmunk (Neotamias umbrinus), is a species of chipmunk in the family Sciuridae. It is endemic to the United States. Formerly known as Tamias umbrinus, phylogenetic studies have shown it to be sufficiently distinct from the eastern chipmunk as to be placed in a separate genus, Neotamias. The same studies have also suggested that Palmer's chipmunk may actually be a subspecies of Uinta chipmunk, although the two are still generally regarded as separate species.

Description
The predominant color of the summer coat varies from yellowish brown-grey to dark brown, often with a reddish tinge. Three wide, distinct dark blackish-brown stripes run down the back, separated and surrounded by four paler stripes of pale grey to white fur. Also, three dark and three pale stripes are on each side of the face. In the winter, the coat becomes duller and more greyish, and the stripes become less distinct. The ears are black, and the underparts a very pale grey. The tail has orange and black fur, with a paler fringe of hair on the underside.

Distribution and habitat
The Uinta chipmunk lives in montane and subalpine forests of the western United States, between  elevation. It is most common at the margins of pine and fir forests, or in clearings, often near rocky terrain or steep slopes. Uinta chipmunks do not have a continuous, unbroken range, but are instead found in a number of disjunct localities, perhaps reflecting changing patterns of forest cover during the Pleistocene. Seven subspecies are currently recognized:

 N. u. adsitus - southern Utah and northern Arizona
 N. u. inyoensis - central Nevada and eastern California
 N. u. fremonti - western Wyoming
 N. u. montanus - western Colorado
 N. u. nevadensis - southern Nevada
 N. u. sedulus - southeastern Utah
 N. u. umbrinus - northern Utah

Diet and behavior
Uinta chipmunks are herbivorous. Their primary diet consists of the seeds of coniferous trees such as Douglas fir, ponderosa pine, juniper, and spruce, and on the fruit of local shrubs such as wild roses, raspberries, and chokecherries. They also eat some grass and fungi, and may supplement their diet with small quantities of insects or carrion.

They establish dens in burrows under rocks, shrubs, or other shelter, or else in natural rock crevices or hollow logs. They spend much of the winter in their dens, but are otherwise highly arboreal, climbing trees to search for food and escape from predators.

The animals have been reported to make a number of different vocalizations, with most common being bursts of sharp "chip" sounds that can continue for up to 15 minutes, and are made from exposed locations, such as rock outcrops or high branches. Other vocalizations include lower-pitched "chuck" sounds, often interspersed with "chips" while fleeing from predators, trills, and squeals.

Reproduction
The breeding season occurs in the spring, roughly from late April to early June, with the exact time depending on the local climate and latitude. The mother gives birth to a single litter of three to five young after a gestation period around 30 days. The young are weaned around 25 days of age, and begin to leave the burrow shortly thereafter. Only 27.5% of Uinta chipmunks survive through the winter, and the maximum life expectancy is believed to be two years.

References

External links

Neotamias
Mammals of the United States
Mammals described in 1890
Taxonomy articles created by Polbot